Keagile Kgosipula (born 2 January 1996) is a Botswana footballer who plays for Township Rollers F.C. and the Botswana national football team.

Career

International
Kgosipula made his senior international debut on 24 March 2018, coming on as a 63rd-minute substitute for Kabelo Dambe in a 1-0 friendly victory over Lesotho.

Career statistics

International

Honours

Clubs
 Township Rollers
Botswana Premier League:3
2016-17, 2017-18, 2018-19
Mascom Top 8 Cup:1
2017-18

Individual

References

External links
Keagile Kgosipula at Township Rollers FC

1996 births
Living people
Botswana footballers
Botswana international footballers
Association football goalkeepers